Mangled Demos from 1983 is a collection of various recordings from the earliest incarnation of American rock group Melvins first recorded in 1983, then remastered and released on Ipecac Records in 2005.

Until 2005, none of the material had ever been officially released, with the exception of the first version of "Forgotten Principles". A few tracks included in this album have previously appeared on bootleg releases. It is the only record featuring the original lineup (guitarist/vocalist Buzz Osborne, bassist Matt Lukin, drummer Mike Dillard). Tracks 3-13 were recorded at Mud Bay, a suburb of Olympia, Washington, for possible album release. Ultimately the album was not released at the time, as no record label was interested in the Melvins until 1985.

Despite the album's title, Allmusic described the sound quality as "surprisingly good."

Track listing
Some song titles were lost over time, they are listed with symbols. Tracks 22 and 23 are silent.
"Elks Lodge Christmas Broadcast" – 3:52
"If You Get Bored (Live Radio)" – 2:22
"Forgotten Principles" – 1:07
"Snake Appeal" – 1:59
"Master Charge" – 1:08
"If You Get Bored" – 1:33
"Set Me Straight" – 2:31
"✪" (Circled white star U+272A) – 1:02
"I'm Dry" – 1:35
"Forgotten Principles" (alternate edit) – 1:19
"I Don't Know" – 1:35
"Matt-Alec" – 3:00
"The Real You" – 1:27
"Run Around" – 1:44
"Keep Away From Me" – 1:22
"☘" (Shamrock U+2618)– 1:00
"Bibulous Confabulation During Rehearsal" – 4:58
"✠" (Maltese Cross U+2720) – 1:21
"✏" (Pencil U+270F) – 1:10
"Matt-Alec" – 3:14
"Walter" – 3:21
"✁" (Upper blade scissors U+2701) – 0:24
"✈" (Airplane U+2708) – 0:22

Vinyl version
The vinyl version of Mangled Demos From 1983 was released on Alternative Tentacles as a double 10" record. Notably, it features a small booklet hidden amongst the vinyl with liner notes by Buzz Osborne detailing life in Washington around 1983 with almost no details on the actual record or recording itself, done in a similar fashion to the liner notes in 26 Songs and Gluey Porch Treatments. The last two tracks (both of which being short silent tracks) are omitted from the vinyl release.

Personnel
Buzz Osborne - vocals, guitar
Matt Lukin - bass
Mike Dillard - drums
Mackie Osborne - design

References

External links
Official Press Release/Liner notes
Information on the Demos-Bootleg

Ipecac Recordings albums
Demo albums
Melvins compilation albums
1983 compilation albums
Alternative Tentacles compilation albums